Per-Åke Åkesson (born 16 January 1955) is a Swedish former footballer who played as a forward.

References 

Association football forwards
Swedish footballers
Allsvenskan players
Malmö FF players
Living people
1955 births